Upper Bhavani is located in the Western Catchments of Nilgiris district, Tamil Nadu, India. It is the birthplace of  Bhavani river. The Upper Bhavani Dam is constructed across the Bhavani river.

Wildlife 
The wildlife include the following:

See also 
Mudumalai National Park
Nilgiri mountains

References

External links 

Hill stations in Tamil Nadu
Tourist attractions in Nilgiris district